The Clerk of the Green Cloth was a position in the British Royal Household. The clerk acted as secretary of the Board of Green Cloth, and was therefore responsible for organising royal journeys and assisting in the administration of the Royal Household. From the Restoration, there were four clerks (two clerks and two clerks comptrollers). Two additional clerks comptrollers were added in 1761, but one of these was redesignated a clerk in 1762.

Remuneration
Each clerk had a salary of £500, with lodgings, diet, fees on the signing of contracts and ancient rights of 'Wast, Command and Remaines', i.e., leftover provisions, which was replaced with an allowance of £438 in 1701, increased to £518 in 1761 (making a total of £1018).  Each clerk had a clerk or writer, who was paid £50 with other fees and allowances, fixed at £150 in 1761 and converted to a salary of £180 in 1769. The offices were all abolished by statute in 1782.

Duties
'All Bills of Comptrolments, &c. relating to the Office, are allotted and allow'd by the Clerks Comptrollers, and summ'd up and Audited by the Clerks of the Green-Cloth'.  They also sat with the other officers as part of the board.

List of Clerks
Data from 'The household below stairs: Clerks of the Green Cloth 1660-1782', Office-Holders in Modern Britain: Volume 11 (revised): Court Officers, 1660-1837 (2006), pp. 403–40.British History online.

The position was held by a number of people including George Stonhouse during the 16th century, though it later became disused.

1660–1761

1761–1782

In addition, several supernumerary clerks comptrollers were appointed in the 17th century:
31 August 1660: William Boreman
22 November 1670: John Trethewy
23 March 1674: Henry Firebrace
11 April 1688: John Fox
28 April 1691: Charles Isaac

In 1988, David Becket of Radley, Oxfordshire obtained Royal consent to revive the title as an honorary post.

References

Positions within the British Royal Household
Ceremonial officers in the United Kingdom
Green Cloth
1782 disestablishments in Great Britain